Rao Saheb Bhosle (born 4 April 1932) is a former Indian first-class cricketer.

Born at Kolhapur in Maharashtra, Bhosle made his debut in first-class cricket for Maharashtra in the 1952–53 Ranji Trophy against Gujarat at Ahmedabad. He played for Maharashtra regularly during the 1950s, making 21 first-class appearances to 1960. He scored a total of 787 runs, with an average of 30.26, making five half centuries with a highest score of 89. Bowling a mixture of right-arm off break and medium pace, Bhosle took 31 wickets at a bowling average of 46.74, with best figures of 4/35. He later played minor counties cricket in England for Cumberland in 1963, making five appearances.

References

External links

1932 births
Living people
People from Kolhapur
Indian cricketers
Maharashtra cricketers
Cumberland cricketers